Evert Björn (21 January 1888 – 21 December 1974) was a Swedish athlete.  He competed in the 1908 Summer Olympics in London and in the 1912 Summer Olympics in Stockholm.

He did not finish his initial semifinal heat of the 1500 metres in 1908, eliminating him from further competition in that event.

Björn placed third in his semifinal heat of the 800 metres, not advancing to the final despite beating defending champion James Lightbody, who placed fourth in the heat.

References

Sources
 
 
 

1888 births
1974 deaths
Athletes (track and field) at the 1908 Summer Olympics
Athletes (track and field) at the 1912 Summer Olympics
Olympic athletes of Sweden
Swedish male middle-distance runners
19th-century Swedish people
20th-century Swedish people